The Canal des mines de fer de la Moselle is a canal in 
north eastern France linking Metz and Thionville. It is a canalized section of the river Moselle.  The canal may also be called CAMIFEMO as concocted from the name of the canal in the following way:  CAnal des MInes de FEr de la MOselle (CAMIFEMO).

See also
 List of canals in France

References

External links
 Structurae

Canals in France
Canals opened in 1932